Neuroblast differentiation-associated protein AHNAK, also known as desmoyokin, is a protein that in humans is encoded by the AHNAK gene. AHNAK was originally identified in 1989 (in bovine muzzle epidermal cells) and named desmoyokin due to its localization pattern (that resembled a yoke) in the desmosomal plaque. AHNAK has been shown to be essential for pseudopod protrusion and cell migration.

Interactions 

AHNAK has been shown to interact with S100B.

References

Further reading

External links